Aponogeton longiplumulosus is a submerged aquatic plant that is native to Madagascar. It possesses an elongated rhizome 2–3 cm in diameter. The leaves are an olive green-brown, 8 - 14 inches (20–35 cm) long and 2.5 inches (6 cm) broad, with a fluted margin and a petiole up to about 24 inches (60 cm) long. No floating leaves are formed. New leaf colour forms have been introduced recently. The flowers are a dark violet in colour.

Cultivation and uses
Aponogeton longiplumulosus is a beautiful aquarium plant and makes no special demands as to water quality though it thrives best in soft water in a medium to bright light. A rich substrate encourages growth and additional  is beneficial. Under good conditions it will flower frequently. It does have dormant periods which last a few weeks. It is often used for larger aquariums. It is propagated by seed, but it has been reported to be difficult to germinate.

References

External links
 Tropica

longiplumulosus
Aquatic plants
Freshwater plants